Matty is a village in Baranya county, Hungary. As of 2004, the population was 369.

External links 
 Street map 

Populated places in Baranya County